Maxi Trusso (born 31 July 1970) is an Argentine singer-songwriter, noted for his distinctive voice. His vocal range is tenor.

Career

Early days

Maxi Trusso started his first steps in music at St. George's College, Argentina, were a group of senior students (Esteban Artica, Giovanni Miano Macadam and Anthony Macadam) motivated him to give his first ‘a capella’ shows in their school freetime in the early 80s.

During the 90s while living in England. During that time he started working in fashion industry, music, participating in projects and theater plays with European writers.

Later, he moved to Italy and formed an electro-pop group called "Roy Vedas" with an Italian artist and edited his first discographic work under the English label Mercury Records. His first hit was a retro-futuristic styled single called "Fragments of life", which reached one of the first places on the Top of the Pops chart. The British magazine The Face chose it as one of the best three tracks of the decade.

With Roy Vedas, he played in different European countries, such as Greece, Denmark and Sweden. They also played as supporting act for The Rolling Stones gigs in Turkey.

Solo career

Back in Argentina, after gaining recognition as a solo artist, he decided to record a classic rock album with folk influences with help of Fernando Goín. His first solo work was titled Leave me and cry and published by label Acqua Records.

He became a successful artist thanks to his distinctive voice and his songs, mostly sung in English, which were heavily aired on radio stations and TV all over Latin America.

Discography

Albums
 Leave me and cry (2006)
 Love gone (2010)
 S.O.S (2014)
  Last call (2016)

Singles
 Fragments of life (1998)
 Same Old Story (2013)
 Nothing at all (2013)
 Himno a Francisco (2014)
 Nobody is Lonely (2014)
 Taste of Love (2015)

Soundtracks
 El Firichinio (2011)

References

External links
 Maxi Trusso official website
 Maxi Trusso Facebook page
 Maxi Trusso Twitter page

1970 births
21st-century Argentine male singers
Argentine pop singers
Argentine rock singers
Argentine male singer-songwriters
20th-century Argentine male singers
Living people
Singers from Buenos Aires
English-language singers from Argentina